The 2007–08 Detroit Pistons season was the 67th season of the franchise, the 60th in the National Basketball Association (NBA), and the 51st in the Detroit area. The Central Division Pistons finished the regular season with a 59-23 record, 14  games ahead of the second place Cavaliers.  Their 59 wins were the third most in franchise history.  In the NBA Playoffs, Detroit advanced to the Eastern Conference Finals for the sixth consecutive time since 2003, making them the first team since the 1986–87 Los Angeles Lakers to appear that many consecutive times in their respective Conference Finals. The Pistons lost to the eventual NBA champions Boston Celtics in the Eastern Conference Finals two games to four. Their game 4 win over Boston on May 26, 2008 remains their most recent playoff victory. The Pistons had the seventh best team offensive rating in the NBA.

Following the season, Flip Saunders was fired as head coach.

Detroit played its home games at The Palace of Auburn Hills in Auburn Hills, Michigan, which was sold out for each of the 41 regular season home games and all nine playoff games.  The Pistons wore the #50 on the upper left side of their jerseys in honor of the 50th anniversary of them playing in Detroit. This season is the last time until the 2015–16 NBA season that the Pistons had a winning record and as of 2021 the last time they won a playoff series.

Offseason
In the offseason, the Pistons re-signed guard Chauncey Billups and forward Amir Johnson. They also signed forward Antonio McDyess to a 2-year contract extension and center Cheikh Samb.

Draft picks
Detroit's selections from the 2007 NBA draft in New York.

Roster

Regular season

Season standings

Record vs. opponents

Game log

|- bgcolor="bbffbb"
| 1 || November 1 || @ Miami ||W 91–80 || Prince (34) || Prince (12) || Billups (11) ||American Airlines Arena19,600 || 1–0
|- bgcolor="bbffbb"
| 2 || November 2 || @ Orlando ||W 116–92 || Murray (19) || McDyess, Wallace (7) || Billups (7) ||Amway Arena17,519 || 2–0
|- bgcolor="bbffbb"
| 3 || November 4 || Atlanta ||W 92–91 || Billups (22) || McDyess (9) || Billups, Hamilton, Wallace (5) ||The Palace of Auburn Hills22,076 || 3–0
|- bgcolor="ffbbbb"
| 4 || November 8 || @ Chicago ||L 97–93 || Wallace (36) || McDyess, Wallace (9) || Billups, Hamilton (6) ||United Center21,797 || 3–1
|- bgcolor="bbffbb"
| 5 || November 9 || LA Clippers ||W 103–79 || Billups (23) || Maxiell (8) || Hamilton (10) ||The Palace of Auburn Hills22,076 || 4–1
|- bgcolor="bbffbb"
| 6 || November 11 || @ Seattle ||W 107–103 || Hamilton (32) || McDyess (15) || Billups, Prince (6) ||KeyArena16,379 || 5–1
|- bgcolor="ffbbbb"
| 7 || November 13 || @ Portland ||L 102–94 || Prince (20) || Hamilton (7) || Billups (9) ||Rose Garden19,980 || 5–2
|- bgcolor="bbffbb"
| 8 || November 14 || @ Golden State ||W 111–104 || Hamilton, Prince, Wallace (22) || Maxiell (14) || Murray (12) ||Oracle Arena18,923 || 6–2
|- bgcolor="ffbbbb"
| 9 || November 16 || @ LA Lakers ||L 103–91 || Hamilton, Prince (16) || Prince (9) || Murray (6) ||Staples Center18,997 || 6–3
|- bgcolor="ffbbbb"
| 10 || November 18 || @ Sacramento ||L 105–95 || Prince (19) || Wallace (12) || Billups (9) ||ARCO Arena12,978 || 6–4
|- bgcolor="bbffbb"
| 11 || November 21 || New York ||W 98–86 || Billups (25) || McDyess, Mohammed (6) || Billups (15) ||The Palace of Auburn Hills22,076 || 7–4
|- bgcolor="bbffbb"
| 12 || November 23 || Philadelphia ||W 83–78 || Prince (15) || Mohammed (9) || Billups (9) || The Palace of Auburn Hills22,076 || 8–4
|- bgcolor="ffbbbb"
| 13 || November 25 || Utah || L 103–93 || McDyess (19) || Mohammed (14) || Hamilton (7) || The Palace of Auburn Hills22,076 || 8–5
|- bgcolor="bbffbb"
| 14 || November 28 || Cleveland ||W 109–74 || Hamilton (18) || Maxiell (10) || Hamilton (6) || The Palace of Auburn Hills22,076 || 9–5
|-

|- bgcolor="bbffbb"
| 15 || December 1 || @ Milwaukee || W 117–91 || Wallace (20) || Wallace (10) || Billups (9) || Bradley Center17,326 || 10–5
|- bgcolor="bbffbb"
| 16 || December 2 || New Jersey || W 118–95 || Hamilton (19) || Maxiell (11) || Billups (9) || The Palace of Auburn Hills22,076 || 11–5
|- bgcolor="bbffbb"
| 17 || December 4 || @ Atlanta || W 106–95 || Prince (23) || Maxiell (9) || Billups (10) || Philips Arena12,754 || 12–5
|- bgcolor="bbffbb"
| 18 || December 5 || @ New Orleans || W 91–76 || Hamilton (21) || Wallace (10) || Billups (7) || New Orleans Arena10,312 || 13–5
|- bgcolor="ffbbbb"
| 19 || December 7 || Chicago || L 98–91 || Billups (27) || Prince (8) || Billups (7) || The Palace of Auburn Hills22,076 || 13–6
|- bgcolor="bbffbb"
| 20 || December 9 || Charlotte || W 104–85 || Billups (20) || McDyess (9) || Billups (6) || The Palace of Auburn Hills22,076 || 14–6
|- bgcolor="bbffbb"
| 21 || December 11 || @ Memphis || W 113–103 ||  Billups (28) || Prince (7) || Billups (14) ||FedExForum11,962 || 15–6
|- bgcolor="ffbbbb"
| 22 || December 12 || @ Houston || L 80–77 || Wallace (21) || Maxiell (13) || Billups (7) || Toyota Center17,453 || 15–7
|- bgcolor="bbffbb"
| 23 || December 14 || Atlanta || W 91–81 || Billups (23) || McDyess (14) || Prince (5) || The Palace of Auburn Hills22,076 || 16–7
|- bgcolor="bbffbb"
| 24 || December 16 || Golden State || W 109–87 || Prince (23) || McDyess (11) || Hamilton (6) ||The Palace of Auburn Hills22,076 || 17–7
|- bgcolor="bbffbb"
| 25 || December 19 || @ Boston || W 87–85 || Billups (28) || Wallace (13) || Billups (8) || TD Banknorth Garden18,624 || 18–7
|- bgcolor="bbffbb"
| 26 || December 21 || Memphis || W 94–67 || Prince (16) || McDyess (11) || Billups (7) ||The Palace of Auburn Hills22,076 || 19–7
|- bgcolor="bbffbb"
| 27 || December 23 || Houston || W 94–82 || Hamilton (17) || McDyess (11) || Billups (8) || The Palace of Auburn Hills22,076 || 20–7
|- bgcolor="bbffbb"
| 28 || December 26 || @ New Jersey || W 101–83 || Hamilton (22) || McDyess (9) || Billups (10) || Izod Center18,055 || 21–7
|- bgcolor="bbffbb"
| 29 || December 28 || Indiana || W 114–101 || Hamilton (23) || Johnson (9) || Hamilton (9) || The Palace of Auburn Hills22,076 || 22–7
|- bgcolor="bbffbb"
| 30 || December 29 || @ Indiana || W 98–92 || Hamilton (24) || Wallace (10) || Billups (7) || Conseco Fieldhouse14,960 || 23–7
|- bgcolor="bbffbb"
| 31 || December 31 || Milwaukee || W 114–69 || Hamilton (20) || McDyess (10) || Billups (12) ||The Palace of Auburn Hills22,076 || 24–7
|-

|- bgcolor="bbffbb"
| 32 || January 2 || @ Washington || W 106–93 || Hamilton (20) || McDyess, Wallace (8) || Hamilton (9) || Verizon Center15,763 || 25–7
|- bgcolor="bbffbb"
| 33 || January 4 || @ Toronto || W 101–85 || Hamilton (22) || McDyess (12) || Billups (9) || Air Canada Centre19,800 || 26–7
|- bgcolor="ffbbbb"
| 34 || January 5 || Boston || L 92–85 || Hamilton (18) || Wallace (8) || Hamilton (8) || The Palace of Auburn Hills22,076 || 26–8
|- bgcolor="ffbbbb"
| 35 || January 9 || @ Dallas || L 102–86 || Hamilton (18) || Wallace (11) || Herrmann (4) || American Airlines Center20,362 || 26–9
|- bgcolor="bbffbb"
| 36 || January 10 || @ San Antonio || W 90–80 || Wallace (23) || Wallace (15) || Billups (6) || AT&T Center18,797 || 27–9
|- bgcolor="bbffbb"
| 37 || January 12 || @ Charlotte || W 103–100 (OT) || Billups (27) || McDyess (11) || Hamilton (8) || Charlotte Bobcats Arena19,091 || 28–9
|- bgcolor="ffbbbb"
| 38 || January 13 || @ New York ||L 89–65 || McDyess (15) || McDyess (13) || Billups (4) || Madison Square Garden17,620 || 28–10
|- bgcolor="bbffbb"
| 39 || January 15 || Toronto || W 103–89 || Hamilton (39) || McDyess (13) || Hamilton (6) || The Palace of Auburn Hills22,076 || 29–10
|- bgcolor="ffbbbb"
| 40 || January 18 || Sacramento || L 100–93 || Billups (28) || McDyess (11) || Billups (10) || The Palace of Auburn Hills22,076 || 29–11
|- bgcolor="ffbbbb"
| 41 || January 19 || @ Chicago || L 97–81 || Billups (27) || McDyess (12) || Billups (5) || United Center22,657 || 29–12
|- bgcolor="ffbbbb"
| 42 || January 21 || @ Orlando || L 102–100 || Hamilton (21) || Wallace (15) || Billups (5) ||Amway Arena17,519 || 29–13
|- bgcolor="bbffbb"
| 43 || January 23 || @ Philadelphia || W 86–78 || Hamilton (21) || McDyess (8) || Wallace (6) || Wachovia Center13,878 || 30–13
|- bgcolor="bbffbb"
| 44 || January 25 || Orlando || W 101–93 || Hamilton (32) || McDyess (13) || Hamilton, Prince (8) || The Palace of Auburn Hills22,076 || 31–13
|- bgcolor="bbffbb"
| 45 || January 29 || @ Indiana || W 110–104 || Wallace (24) || McDyess (13) || Billups (8) || Conseco Fieldhouse12,572 || 32–13
|- bgcolor="bbffbb"
| 46 || January 31 || LA Lakers || W 90–89 || Prince (22) || McDyess (12) || Billups (7) || The Palace of Auburn Hills22,076 || 33–13
|-

|- bgcolor="bbffbb"
| 47 || February 3 || Dallas || W 90–67 || Wallace (21) || McDyess (11) || Hamilton (7) || The Palace of Auburn Hills22,076 || 34–13
|- bgcolor="bbffbb"
| 48 || February 6 || Miami || W 100–95 || Wallace (26) || McDyess (13) || Billups (10) || The Palace of Auburn Hills22,076 || 35–13
|- bgcolor="bbffbb"
| 49 || February 8 || Portland || W 91–82 || Billups (17) || Johnson, Prince, Wallace (6) || Billups (5) || The Palace of Auburn Hills22,076 || 36–13
|- bgcolor="bbffbb"
| 50 || February 10 || Charlotte || W 113–87 || Prince (21) || McDyess (12) || Billups (7) || The Palace of Auburn Hills22,076 || 37–13
|- bgcolor="bbffbb"
| 51 || February 12 || @ Atlanta || W 94–90 || Wallace (21) || McDyess (6) || Billups (8) || Philips Arena18,227 || 38–13
|- bgcolor="bbffbb"
| 52 || February 13 || Indiana || W 96–80 || Billups, Hamilton, Prince (14) || Maxiell (14) || Billups (6) || The Palace of Auburn Hills22,076 || 39–13
|- bgcolor="ffbbbb"
| 53 || February 19 || Orlando || L 103–85 || Stuckey (16) || McDyess (14) || Billups (5) || The Palace of Auburn Hills22,076 || 39–14
|- bgcolor="ffbbbb"
| 54 || February 20 || @ Milwaukee || L 103–98 || Billups (34) || McDyess (14) || Billups, Prince (6) || Bradley Center14,211 || 39–15
|- bgcolor="bbffbb"
| 55 || February 22 || Milwaukee || W 127–100 || Billups (21) || McDyess (7) || Billups (12) || The Palace of Auburn Hills22,076 || 40–15
|- bgcolor="bbffbb"
| 56 || February 24 || @ Phoenix || W 116–86 || Wallace (22) || McDyess (13) || Billups (11) || US Airways Center18,422 || 41–15
|- bgcolor="bbffbb"
| 57 || February 25 || @ Denver || W 98–93 || Billups, Hamilton, Prince (20) || McDyess (13) || Prince (9) || Pepsi Center17,901 || 42–15
|- bgcolor="ffbbbb"
| 58 || February 27 || @ Utah || L 103–95 || Hamilton (22) || McDyess (10) || Billups, Prince (4) || EnergySolutions Arena19,911 || 42–16
|-

|- bgcolor="bbffbb"
| 59 || March 1 || @ LA Clippers || W 103–73 || Prince (22) || Maxiell (8) || Prince (10) || Staples Center19,271 || 43–16
|- bgcolor="bbffbb"
| 60 || March 4 || Seattle || W 100–97 || Prince (24) || Maxiell (9) || Billups (9) || The Palace of Auburn Hills22,076 || 44–16
|- bgcolor="ffbbbb"
| 61 || March 5 || @ Boston || L 90–78 || Billups, Wallace (23) || Prince (10) || Billups (7) || TD Banknorth Garden18,624 || 44–17
|- bgcolor="bbffbb"
| 62 || March 7 || @ New York || W 101–97 || Prince (28) || Prince (7) || Billups (5) || Madison Square Garden19,763 || 45–17
|- bgcolor="bbffbb"
| 63 || March 9 || Chicago || W 116–109 || Billups (34) || McDyess (10) || Hamilton (7) || The Palace of Auburn Hills22,076 || 46–17
|- bgcolor="ffbbbb"
| 64 || March 12 || Philadelphia || L 83–82 || Wallace (17) || McDyess (11) || Hamilton (4) || The Palace of Auburn Hills22,076 || 46–18
|- bgcolor="bbffbb"
| 65 || March 14 || San Antonio || W 84–80 || Hamilton (25) || McDyess (17) || Billups (8) || The Palace of Auburn Hills22,076 || 47–18
|- bgcolor="bbffbb"
| 66 || March 16 || New Orleans || W 105–84 || Hayes (29) || McDyess (11) || Hamilton (6) || The Palace of Auburn Hills22,076 || 48–18
|- bgcolor="bbffbb"
| 67 || March 18 || Denver || W 136–120 || Hamilton (24) || Maxiell, McDyess (7) || Billups (10) || The Palace of Auburn Hills22,076 || 49–18
|- bgcolor="ffbbbb"
| 68 || March 19 || @ Cleveland || L 89–73 || Wallace (16) || McDyess (11) || Hamilton (7) || Quicken Loans Arena20,562 || 49–19
|- bgcolor="ffbbbb"
| 69 || March 23 || @ Washington || L 95–83 || Hamilton (19) || McDyess (14) || Billups (11) || Verizon Center20,173 || 49–20
|- bgcolor="bbffbb"
| 70 || March 24 || Phoenix || W 110–105 || Billups (32) || Wallace (9) || Billups (6) || The Palace of Auburn Hills22,076 || 50–20
|- bgcolor="ffbbbb"
| 71 || March 26 || @ Toronto || L 89–82 || Billups (24) || Prince (8) || Billups (9) || Air Canada Centre19,800 || 50–21
|- bgcolor="bbffbb"
| 72 || March 27 || Miami || W 85–69 || Afflalo, Maxiell (15) || Prince (8) || Billups (11) || The Palace of Auburn Hills22,076 || 51–21
|- bgcolor="bbffbb"
| 73 || March 29 || Cleveland || W 85–71 || Hamilton (14) || McDyess (10) || Prince (5) || The Palace of Auburn Hills22,076 || 52–21
|-

|- bgcolor="bbffbb"
| 74 || April 1 || @ Minnesota || W 94–90 || Stuckey (27) || McDyess (10) || Prince (6) || Target Center15,119 || 53–21
|- bgcolor="bbffbb"
| 75 || April 4 || New Jersey || W 106–87 || McDyess (19) || Wallace (8) || Stuckey (9) ||The Palace of Auburn Hills22,076 || 54–21
|- bgcolor="bbffbb"
| 76 || April 6 || @ Miami || W 91–75 || Stuckey (19) || Johnson, Maxiell (7) || Billups (6) ||American Airlines Arena19,141 || 55–21
|- bgcolor="ffbbbb"
| 77 || April 8 || New York || L 98–94 || Johnson (14) || Maxiell (10) || Billups, Stuckey (3) ||The Palace of Auburn Hills22,076 || 55–22
|- bgcolor="ffbbbb"
| 78 || April 9 || @ Philadelphia || L 101–94 || Billups (18) || Johnson (7) || Stuckey (6) ||Wachovia Center18,945 || 55–23
|- bgcolor="bbffbb"
| 79 || April 11 || Washington || W 102–74 || Maxiell (28) || Wallace (9) || Hamilton (10) ||The Palace of Auburn Hills22,076 || 56–23
|- bgcolor="bbffbb"
| 80 || April 13 || Toronto || W 91–84 || Stuckey (18) || McDyess (9) || Billups (4) ||The Palace of Auburn Hills22,076 || 57–23
|- bgcolor="bbffbb"
| 81 || April 15 || Minnesota || W 115–103 || Hayes (20) || Prince (7) || Billups (6) || The Palace of Auburn Hills22,076 || 58–23
|- bgcolor="bbffbb"
| 82 || April 16 || @ Cleveland || W 84–74 || Afflalo (15) || Afflalo, Johnson (8) || Dixon (9) || Quicken Loans Arena20,562 || 59–23
|-

Playoffs

|- bgcolor="ffbbbb"
| 1 || April 20 || Philadelphia || L 86–90 || Wallace (24) || Maxiell (11) || Billups, Hamilton (4) || The Palace of Auburn Hills22,076 || 0–1
|- bgcolor="bbffbb"
| 2 || April 23 || Philadelphia || W 105–88 || Hamilton (20) || McDyess (12) || Hamilton (7) || The Palace of Auburn Hills22,076 || 1–1
|- bgcolor="ffbbbb"
| 3 || April 25 || @ Philadelphia || L 75–95 || Hamilton (23) || Hamilton (6) || Stuckey (5) || Wachovia Center18,805 || 1–2
|- bgcolor="bbffbb"
| 4 || April 27 || @ Philadelphia || W 93–84 || Prince (23) || Wallace (10) || Billups, Hamilton (7) || Wachovia Center18,347 || 2–2
|- bgcolor="bbffbb"
| 5 || April 29 || Philadelphia || W 98–81 || Billups (21) || Maxiell (11) || Billups (12) || The Palace of Auburn Hills22,076 || 3–2
|- bgcolor="bbffbb"
| 6 || May 1 || @ Philadelphia || W 100–77 || Hamilton (24) || Billups (7) || Prince (7) || Wachovia Center14,130 || 4–2
|-

|- bgcolor="bbffbb"
| 1 || May 3 || Orlando || W 91–72 || Billups (19) || Maxiell (9) || Billups (7) || The Palace of Auburn Hills22,076  || 1–0
|- bgcolor="bbffbb"
| 2 || May 5 || Orlando || W 100–93 || Billups (28) || Prince (10) || Prince (5) || The Palace of Auburn Hills22,076 || 2–0
|- bgcolor="ffbbbb"
| 3 || May 7 || @ Orlando || L 86–111 || Hamilton (24) || Prince (7) || Hamilton, Prince (3) || Amway Arena17,519 || 2–1
|- bgcolor="bbffbb"
| 4 || May 10 || @ Orlando || W 90–89  || Hamilton (32) || McDyess (14) || Prince (5) || Amway Arena17,519 || 3–1
|- bgcolor="bbffbb"
| 5 || May 13 || Orlando || W 91–86 || Hamilton (31) || McDyess (11) || Stuckey (6) || The Palace of Auburn Hills22,076 || 4–1
|-

|- bgcolor="ffbbbb"
| 1 || May 20 || @ Boston || L 79–88 || Prince (16) || McDyess (11) || Wallace (4) || TD Banknorth Garden18,624 || 0–1
|- bgcolor="bbffbb"
| 2 || May 22 || @ Boston || W 103–97 || Hamilton (25) || Wallace (10) || Billups (7) || TD Banknorth Garden18,624 || 1–1
|- bgcolor="ffbbbb"
| 3 || May 24 || Boston || L 80–94 || Hamilton (26) || McDyess, Wallace (8) || Billups, Stuckey (4) || The Palace of Auburn Hills22,076 || 1–2
|- bgcolor="bbffbb"
| 4 || May 26 || Boston || W 94–75 || McDyess (21)  || McDyess (17) || Hamilton (7) || The Palace of Auburn Hills22,076 || 2–2
|- bgcolor="ffbbbb"
| 5 || May 28 || @ Boston || L 102–106 || Billups (26) || Billups, McDyess (5) || Billups, Hamilton (6) || TD Banknorth Garden18,624 || 2–3
|- bgcolor="ffbbbb"
| 6 || May 30 || Boston || L 81–89 || Billups (29) || Wallace (10) || Billups (6) || The Palace of Auburn Hills22,076 || 2–4
|-

Awards and records

Awards
Chauncey Billups was awarded the John Walter Kennedy Citizenship Award for taking much part in NBA Cares and other charity foundations.

Records
On May 13, 2008, Richard Hamilton surpassed Isiah Thomas as the all-time Piston leading scorer in the playoffs. Hamilton broke Thomas' record of 2,261 points and did it in 110 games — one fewer than Thomas needed to set the mark.

Milestones
Chauncey Billups recorded his 10,000th career point November 14, 2007 against the Portland Trail Blazers.

Player stats

Regular season

* Statistics include only games with Pistons

Playoffs

Transactions
The Pistons have been involved in the following transactions during the 2007–08 season.

Trades

Free agents

See also
2007–08 NBA season

References

External links
 Official web site

Detroit Pistons seasons
2007 in sports in Michigan
2008 in sports in Michigan
2007–08 NBA season by team